Seixal is a city and a municipality in Portugal. It may also refer to the following places:

Cape Verde

 Seixal, Cape Verde, a village in the municipality of São Vicente, island of São Vicente

Portugal

 Seixal (Porto Moniz), a civil parish in the municipality of Porto Moniz, Madeira
 Seixal (parish), a former civil parish in the municipality of Seixal
 Seixal, Arrentela e Aldeia de Paio Pires, a civil parish in the municipality of Seixal